László Gyimesi may refer to:

 László Gyimesi, Hungarian pianist
 László Gyimesi, Hungarian former footballer